Ernest George Frederick Vogtherr (1898–1973) was a notable New Zealand bacon curer, businessman and art collector. He was born in Sunderland, England in 1898.

References

1898 births
1973 deaths
New Zealand art collectors
English emigrants to New Zealand
20th-century New Zealand businesspeople
People from Sunderland
Businesspeople from Tyne and Wear
New Zealand butchers